Double Time is an album by American banjoist Béla Fleck, released in 1984.

Every song is a duet with some of the stars of the genre. The billing includes Mark O'Connor, Sam Bush, David Grisman, Pat Flynn, Tony Rice, and Jerry Douglas, among others. In his Allmusic review, Brian Kelly stated, "the program features a dozen or so warm, homegrown finger exercises that dot the music map everywhere between bluegrass and jazz fusion."
This album can be compared with similar effort by David Grisman, Dawg Duos, where Fleck performs duo with Grisman on one of the tracks.

Track listing 
All songs by Béla Fleck
 "Spunk" – 2:14
 "Black Forest" – 2:43
 "Double Play" – 2:59
 "Lowdown" – 3:37
 "The Bullfrog Shuffle" – 1:37
 "Another Morning" – 3:34
 "Light Speed" – 2:34
 "Sweet Rolls" – 3:20
 "Ladies and Gentleman" – 2:23
 "Right As Rain" – 2:32
 "Far Away" – 2:22
 "Ready to Go" – 1:54
 "The Fast Lane" – 3:21

Personnel
 Béla Fleck – 5-string banjo (1-13)
 Mark O'Connor – fiddle (1)
 David Grisman – mandolin (2)
 Tony Rice – guitar (3)
 Edgar Meyer – bass (4)
 Mark Schatz – banjo (5)
 Jerry Douglas – dobro (6)
 Mike Marshall – mandolin (7)
 John Hartford – banjo (8)
 Darol Anger – cello (9)
 Pat Flynn – guitar (10)
 Mike Marshall – mandolin (11)
 Ricky Skaggs – fiddle (12)
 Sam Bush – mandolin (13)

Production notes:
Howard Johnson – engineer
Kurt Storey – engineer
Bil VornDick – engineer
David Glasser – mastering
Susan Marsh – design, illustrations

References

1984 albums
Béla Fleck albums
Rounder Records albums
Instrumental duet albums